Edwin Hennig (27 April 1882 – 12 November 1977) was a German paleontologist.

Career

Edwin Hennig was one of five children of a merchant who died when Hennig was 10 years old. Starting in 1902, Hennig studied natural sciences, anthropology, and philosophy at the University of Freiburg in Freiburg im Breisgau, Baden-Württemberg, Germany where earned a doctorate in 1906 with Otto Jaekel. This is where Hennig significantly contributed to research on the extinct genus Gyrodus.

Afterwards, he was an assistant to Wilhelm von Branca at Berlin’s Friedrich-Wilhelms-Universität, where he attained his habilitation and became a private lecturer.

During World War I, he was a military geologist until 1917 where he became a professor at the University of Tübingen and later an academic rector and director of the geological paleontology institute. Hennig later joined the National Socialist German Workers' Party in 1937. In 1945, he was relieved of office and submitted to denazification. Hennig retired in 1951.

Edwin Hennig is well known for joining expeditions with Werner Janensch to the Tendaguru Beds in what is now Tanzania, East Africa. He is also known for describing discoveries of Australopithecus afarensis from East Africa, collected by Ludwig Kohl-Larsen.

Much like Othenio Abel, Hennig was a supporter of orthogenesis theories of evolution as was his assistant, Karl Beurlen.

See also

Kentrosaurus

References

1882 births
1977 deaths
German paleontologists
Academic staff of the Humboldt University of Berlin
Orthogenesis
Nazi Party members
Scientists active at the Museum für Naturkunde, Berlin
University of Freiburg alumni
Academic staff of the University of Tübingen